Lower Kuttanad comprises taluks of Ambalapuzha, Kuttanad (excluding Edathua, Thalavady and Muttar villages) and northern half of Karthikapally taluk in Alappuzha district, Kerala, India.

Places in Alappuzha district